The Ngulungbara were an Aboriginal Australian people or clan of Fraser Island in the state of Queensland, possibly of the Butchulla people.

Country
The Ngulingbara's status as an independent tribe has been contested, since some authorities consider them to have been a horde of the Butchulla, since the -bara suffix in their ethnonym is suggestive of a clan grouping.

Alternative names
 Olongbura
 Gnoolongbara
 Koolaburra

Notes

Citations

Sources

Aboriginal peoples of Queensland